"One of a Kind" is a song by Swedish singer Pandora. It was released in April 1994 as the third single from the debut studio album One of a Kind (1993). It features an uncredited rap by K-Slim. The song peaked at number 33 on the Swedish charts.

Track listing
CD Single
 "One of a Kind" (Radio Edit) - 3:37
 "One of a Kind"  (D-House Remix) - 4:44

CD Maxi
 "One of a Kind" (Radio Edit) - 3:37
 "One of a Kind"  (D-House Remix) - 4:44
 "Going to the Top" - 3:26

Chart performance

References

1994 singles
1993 songs
English-language Swedish songs
Virgin Records singles
Pandora (singer) songs